Karen D. Camper (born January 15, 1958) is an American politician and a Democratic member of the Tennessee House of Representatives representing District 87 since her special election March 31, 2008 to fill the vacancy caused by the death of Gary Rowe. She is a candidate for the 2023 Memphis mayoral election.

Education
Camper attended the University of Tennessee and earned her AS from the University at Albany, SUNY.

Career

Elections
2012 Camper was unopposed for both the August 2, 2012 Democratic Primary, winning with 4,917 votes, and the November 6, 2012 General election, winning with 18,282 votes.
2008 Camper was challenged in the August 7, 2008 Democratic Primary, winning with 2,242 votes (66.8%), and was unopposed for the November 4, 2008 General election, winning with 11,733 votes.
2010 Camper was challenged in the August 5, 2010 Democratic Primary, winning with 3,075 votes (75.6%), and was unopposed for the November 2, 2010 General election, winning with 6,111 votes.

Tenure

Camper was elected on December 17, 2018 to be the Leader of the Tennessee House Democratic Caucus, the first African-American leader in the Tennessee House of Representatives.

On November 11, 2022, Camper announced she was running in the 2023 Memphis mayoral election.

Personal life
Camper is baptist. She is divorced and has a child named Bruce, Jr.

References

External links
Official page at the Tennessee General Assembly
Campaign site

Karen Camper at Ballotpedia
Karen Camper at the National Institute on Money in State Politics

1958 births
20th-century African-American people
21st-century African-American women
21st-century African-American politicians
21st-century American politicians
21st-century American women politicians
African-American female military personnel
African-American state legislators in Tennessee
African-American women in politics
Living people
Democratic Party members of the Tennessee House of Representatives
Place of birth missing (living people)
Politicians from Memphis, Tennessee
United States Army officers
University at Albany, SUNY alumni
University of Tennessee alumni
Women state legislators in Tennessee
Women in the United States Army
20th-century African-American women
Women opposition leaders
African-American United States Army personnel